Finite part may refer to:

Cauchy principal value
Hadamard finite part